"Just Push Play" is a song by American rock band Aerosmith, taken from their 13th studio album of the same name (2001). The song was written by Steven Tyler, Mark Hudson, and Steve Dudas. It was released as a single on April 17, 2001, peaking at number 10 on the US Billboard Mainstream Rock Tracks chart. Following its usage in Dodge Ram advertisements, "Just Push Play" was added to pop radio in November 2001 and reached number 38 on the Billboard Top 40 Mainstream chart.

Song structure
The song is known for its distorted guitars, use of synthesizers (especially with drums and lyrics), and Steven Tyler's patois-style singing.  The chorus of the song also features the phrase "fuckin' A" which is bleeped out through use of a turntable for much of the song; until the end, when the expletive can actually be heard a few times. The radio edit bleeps this out while the radio remix replaces the lyrics.  The song also features a reference to "Walk This Way".

In other media
The song was performed heavily on Aerosmith's Just Push Play Tour and was also featured in Dodge Ram commercials, during the band's 2001 partnership with the car company. The song was also played during Aerosmith's performance at the historic United We Stand: What More Can I Give benefit concert in October 2001. The track was also included in Aerosmith's 2002 career-spanning compilation O, Yeah! Ultimate Aerosmith Hits, but was a radio-edit version of the track instead of the original.

Music video
The music video for the song is merely clips of the band performing the song in concert.

Charts

Release history

References

2001 singles
2001 songs
Aerosmith songs
Columbia Records singles
Rap metal songs
Songs written by Mark Hudson (musician)
Songs written by Steven Tyler